Dalloz is a French publisher that specializes in legal matters and is France's main legal publisher.  It was founded by Désiré Dalloz and his brother Armand in 1845. Dalloz was acquired by Groupe de La Cite in 1989. CEP acquired almost complete control of Groupe de La Cite in 1995. Havas acquired full ownership of CEP in 1997 and In 1998, Havas was acquired by the company that became Vivendi. Presses de la Cité became part of Vivendi Universal Publishing (VUP), which in 2002 was sold to Hachette Group. In 2011, Dalloz's turnover amounted to 51,256,788 euros, rising steadily since the creation of the company (except during the war years).

Among other collections (Precis dalloz...), Dalloz is known for its encyclopedia of law that covers different branches of law: civil law, business law, international law, criminal law, European law, etc.  Dalloz has published commentary, cases and legislation in a series of bulletins referred to generally as Recueil Dalloz.

 Recueil Dalloz (1945–1964);
 Recueil Dalloz Sirey de doctrine, de jurisprudence et de législation (1965–1996);
 Recueil Dalloz (1997–1999);
 Recueil le Dalloz (1999–) Published weekly.

Some topics are now only available online.

See also
Law of France

References

External links
  Official site

Publishing companies of France
Publishing companies established in 1845
Companies established in 1845
Encyclopedias of law
Law of France
Legal literature